The Bensafrim River is a river in Portugal.

External links

Rivers of Portugal
Rivers of the Algarve